Sultana Yesmin Boishakhi (born 13 August 1989) is a Bangladeshi former cricketer who played as a wicket-keeper and right-handed batter. She appeared in seven One Day Internationals and one Twenty20 International for Bangladesh between 2011 and 2013. She played domestic cricket for Khulna Division. She also did her certification from the National Fitness and Nutrition Academy

Early life and background
Yesmin was born on 13 August 1989 in Bangladesh.

Career

ODI career
Yesmin made her ODI debut against  Ireland on 26 November 2011.

T20I career
Yesmin made her T20I debut against India on 5 April 2013.

Asian games
Yesmin was a member of the team that won a silver medal in cricket against the China national women's cricket team at the 2010 Asian Games in Guangzhou, China.

References

External links
 
 

1989 births
Living people
Bangladeshi women cricketers
Bangladesh women One Day International cricketers
Bangladesh women Twenty20 International cricketers
Khulna Division women cricketers
Cricketers at the 2010 Asian Games
Asian Games medalists in cricket
Asian Games silver medalists for Bangladesh
Medalists at the 2010 Asian Games
Wicket-keepers